Drivin' & Dreaming LIVE is an album by Sofia Talvik and was released 2013.

Track listing
King Of The Willow Tree 02:56
When Winter Comes 03:48
Florida 02:30
The War 03:46
Cars 03:48
If I Had A Man 03:24
Uti vår hage 02:42
The Garden 03:50
Something Good 02:44
7 Miles Wide 05:40
She's Leaving 03:32

References
Drivin' & Dreaming LIVE information 

2013 live albums
Sofia Talvik albums